WTCS may refer to:

 WBKE (AM), a radio station (1490 AM) licensed to serve Fairmont, West Virginia, United States, which held the call sign WTCS until 2018
 Western Technical-Commercial School, high school in Toronto, Ontario, Canada
 Wisconsin Technical College System, system of 16 public technical colleges administered by the state of Wisconsin, United States
 WTCS-LP, a low-power radio station (99.7 FM) licensed to serve Chattanooga, Tennessee, United States